Algeria will compete at the 2007 World Championships in Athletics with 11 athletes.

Competitors 

Nations at the 2007 World Championships in Athletics
World Championships in Athletics
Algeria at the World Championships in Athletics